The 2005 UTEP Miners football team represented the University of Texas at El Paso in the 2005 NCAA Division I-A football season. The team's head coach was Mike Price. The Miners played their home games at the Sun Bowl Stadium in El Paso, Texas. This was the team's first season participating in Conference USA. UTEP averaged 47,899 fans per game, ranking 44th nationally.

Schedule

References

UTEP
UTEP Miners football seasons
UTEP Miners football